An ibrik is a container with a spout used for storing and pouring liquid contents.

See also
Cezve (Turkish coffee pot)
Dallah (Arabic coffee pot)
Jebena (Ethiopian coffee pot)
 Turkish coffee

External links 
Tombac basin and ewer (ibrik). turkishculture.org.
Ewer (ibrik). discoverislamicart.org.

References 

Liquid containers
Glass containers